Hetta  is the main village in the municipality of Enontekiö in the north-west part of Finnish Lapland. It is also the municipality's administrative centre and the start or end point of the standard trekking / skiing route across the Pallas-Yllastunturi National Park.

Otherwise, the nearest Finnish airport is Kittilä, c. 2 hours South although Alta, in Norway is a similar distance. Tromso (Norway), Kiruna (Sweden) and Rovaniemi (Finland) are all a similar distance (c. 3–4 hours drive) although flying into Tromso is a good option if your intention is to spend the majority of your time in the far West of Enontekiö, in the village of Kilpisjärvi.

Hetta is a popular tourist destination for cross country skiers and winter outdoor activity enthusiasts. Ice fishing, husky sledding (the local company, Hetta Huskies, won a Gold Award in the World Responsible Tourism Awards in 2015), snowmobiling and visiting traditional reindeer farms are all popular activities for visitors. There is also plenty of cabin and hotel accommodation and easy access to the high tundra arctic plateaus just 20 km north of the village.

External links

 Satellite map at Maplandia

Enontekiö
Villages in Finland